Richard Cubison is a British actor who has been active on television and in films since 1980. Captain of The Stage Golf Society 2020

His first television role came in 1980 when he played a "heavy" in an episode of Minder. He has also appeared in TV serials including The Cleopatras, Just Good Friends, Inspector Morse, Little Dorrit, Wycliffe, Pie in the Sky, Casualty and The Bill. He also appeared in as Antonin Dolohov in Harry Potter and the Order of the Phoenix in 2007.

Filmography

External links

Year of birth missing (living people)
Living people
Place of birth missing (living people)
British male television actors
British male film actors